Thyme is any member of the genus Thymus of aromatic herbs with culinary, medicinal, and ornamental uses.

Thyme may also refer to:

Plants
Thymus (plant), a genus of herbs
Thymus vulgaris, common thyme
Thymus citriodorus, lemon thyme
Plectranthus amboinicus, Caribbean thyme
Acinos alpinus, rock thyme
Veronica serpyllifolia, thyme-leaf speedwell

Other uses
Thyme (band), a Japanese band
ThYme (database), a database for thioester-active enzymes 
Thyme, a chain of British bars

See also
Thymus (disambiguation)
Time (disambiguation)
Thymeleaf, a web templating engine for Java
TYME, an ATM/interbank network in Wisconsin and the Upper Peninsula of Michigan